Armon Trick (born 4 February 1978 in Rottweil, Germany) is a retired German international rugby union player, formerly playing for the SC Neuenheim in the Rugby-Bundesliga and the German national rugby union team.

Biography
Armon Trick, born in Rottweil, started playing rugby when he was 16 years old in 1994, joining local club RC Rottweil. After spending a season with RC Strasbourg in France he came back to play together with his older brother Marcus Trick for RC Rottweil again. In 1999 he and his brother signed with SC Neuenheim.

He earned his first cap for Germany in 2005 and played 2 times for Germany since then.

On domestic level, he won two German championships with his club team in 2003 and 2004 and made losing appearances in the 2001 finals against DRC Hannover and again in 2006 against RG Heidelberg.

At the end of the 2011-12 season he decided to retire from playing rugby.

Honours

Club
 German rugby union championship
 Winner: 2003, 2004
 Runners up: 2001, 2006
 German rugby union cup
 Winner: 1999, 2001
 Runners up: 2002, 2010

Stats
Armon Trick's personal statistics in club and international rugby:

Club

 As of 30 April 2012

References

External links
 Armon Trick profile at totalrugby.de

1978 births
Living people
People from Rottweil (district)
Sportspeople from Freiburg (region)
Rugby union locks
German rugby union players
Germany international rugby union players
SC Neuenheim players